Rainbow Greens was a green political party in Italy.

It was founded in May 1989 by splinters of Proletarian Democracy (Mario Capanna, Virginio Bettini, Gianni Tamino, Edo Ronchi and Paolo Gentiloni) and some leading Radicals (Adelaide Aglietta, Adele Faccio, Francesco Rutelli, Franco Corleone and Marco Boato).

It took part in the 1989 European elections, under the denomination 'Rainbow Greens for Europe' (Verdi Arcobaleno per l'Europa), receiving 2.4% of the vote and electing 2 MEPs, who sat in the Green Group.

In December 1990 it merged with the Federation of Green Lists (Gianni Mattioli, Lino De Benetti, Gianfranco Amendola, Alexander Langer, Enrico Falqui, Sauro Turroni and Alfonso Pecoraro Scanio) to form the Federation of the Greens.

References

1989 establishments in Italy
1990 disestablishments in Italy
Defunct political parties in Italy
Green political parties in Italy
Political parties disestablished in 1990
Political parties established in 1989